Kaire Kaljurand (born 10 December 1974) is an Estonian former footballer who played for the Estonia women's national team.

Career
Kaljurand played in the first ever official match for Estonia, against Lithuania. She represented Estonia on 24 occasions and scored one goal.

Personal life
Cross-country skiing was the first sport that Kaljurand practised. Since 2000, she has been working at the Estonian Maritime Academy in the Department of Marine Biology as a laboratory assistant and researcher.

References

1974 births
Living people
Estonian women's footballers
Estonia women's international footballers
Footballers from Tallinn
Women's association footballers not categorized by position